Papilio albinus is a species of swallowtail butterfly from the genus Papilio that is found in west Western New Guinea and Papua New Guinea. The species was first described by Alfred Russel Wallace in 1865.

Subspecies
Papilio albinus albinus (West Irian)
Papilio albinus lesches Godman & Salvin, 1880 (New Guinea)
Papilio albinus yapenensis Goode 2012 (Yapen Island, New Guinea)
Papilio albinus yahukimo Goode, 2012 (Papua, Yayawijaya Mountains)

Taxonomy
Papilio albinus is a member of the fuscus species group. The members of this clade are
 Papilio albinus Wallace, 1865
 Papilio diophantus Grose-Smith, 1883
 Papilio fuscus Goeze, 1779
 Papilio hipponous C. Felder & R. Felder, 1862
 Papilio jordani Fruhstorfer, 1906
 Papilio pitmani Elwes & de Nicéville, [1887]
 Papilio prexaspes C. Felder & R. Felder, 1865
 Papilio sakontala Hewitson, 1864

References

External links
"Papilio albinus Wallace, 1865". Insecta.pro. With images.

albinus
Butterflies of Oceania
Lepidoptera of New Guinea
Lepidoptera of Papua New Guinea
Butterflies described in 1865
Taxa named by Alfred Russel Wallace